Singai Nesan (English: Singapore Friend, also transliterated as Cinkai Necan) was a Tamil language weekly newspaper published from Singapore from 1887 to 1890. The newspaper also carried material in English and Malay. It is the oldest Tamil newspaper in Singapore of which a substantial number of issues has been saved in archives. The issues of Singai Nesan contains historical material on the religious life of Hindu and Muslim communities of Singapore. S.K. Makadoom Saiboo was the editor of Singai Nesan.

The first issue of the newspaper was published on 27 June 1887, in commemoration of the Golden Jubilee of Queen Victoria. The inaugural issue carried editorial articles in Tamil and English in honour of the Queen. The issue also carried a small editorial in Tamil in tribute to the Ottoman Sultan Abdul Hamid II.

Singai Nesan had the majority of its subscribers in Singapore, but subscribers were also found in Batu Pahat, Klang, Kuala Lumpur, Penang, Siam, Porto Novo, Sibolga, Padang, Medan, Langkat, Saigon and Melaka. The majority of subscribers were Muslims, but the readership also included Hindus and Christians. It was published by Denodaya Press, which printed both Malay and Tamil literature.

Large chunks of the material printed in Singai Nesan were borrowed from the English-language press and the Reuters agency. Whilst it provided the Colombo-based newspapers Muslim Nesan and Sarvajana Nesan with article material from South-East Asia, the newspaper copied material from them on Middle Eastern affairs.

References

Newspapers established in 1887
Publications disestablished in 1890
Tamil-language newspapers
Defunct newspapers published in Singapore
Defunct weekly newspapers